Cedergren is a Swedish surname.

Geographical distribution
As of 2014, 71.7% of all known bearers of the surname Cedergren were residents of Sweden (frequency 1:8,668), 18.2% of the United States (1:1,254,345), 2.3% of Norway (1:138,982), 1.9% of Canada (1:1,226,600), 1.4% of Denmark (1:256,570) and 1.4% of Finland (1:249,854).

In Sweden, the frequency of the surname was higher than national average (1:8,668) in the following counties:
 1. Gotland County (1:790)
 2. Södermanland County (1:4,899)
 3. Dalarna County (1:4,909)
 4. Skåne County (1:5,806)
 5. Stockholm County (1:6,840)
 6. Kalmar County (1:6,952)
 7. Blekinge County (1:6,997)
 8. Örebro County (1:7,708)

Notable people
 Hugo Cedergren (1891–1971), Swedish scouting executive
 Jakob Cedergren (born 1973), Swedish-born Danish actor
 Joel Cedergren (born 1974), Swedish football manager and former player

References

Swedish-language surnames